For the Birds is the fourth album from The Mess Hall and was released on 11 November 2009. It peaked at No. 2 on the ARIA Hitseekers Albums Chart.

Track listing
 "My Villain" 
 "Bell"
 "Tijuana 500"
 "Bare"
 "Marlene"
 "Silhouettes"
 "New Ornithology" 
 "The Switch"
 "Long Time Death" 
 "Swing Low"

Personnel 
Jed Kurzel – vocals, guitar
Cec Condon – drums, vocals

References

2009 albums
The Mess Hall albums